Diplocalyptis operosa is a species of moth of the family Tortricidae first described by Edward Meyrick in 1908. It is found in Sri Lanka, Sumatra, and Taiwan.

References

Archipini
Moths of Sumatra
Moths of Sri Lanka
Moths of Taiwan
Moths described in 1908
Taxa named by Edward Meyrick